Acrophytidae is a family of corals belonging to the order Alcyonacea.

Genera:
 Acrophytum Hickson, 1900
 Lampophyton Williams, 2000
 Pieterfaurea Verseveldt & Bayer, 1988

References

Alcyoniina
Cnidarian families